Ingura may refer to:

 Ingura people, an ethnic group of Australia
 Ingura language, an Australian language
 Ingura (moth), a genus of moths, now considered a synonym of Paectes